Laura Goodman Salverson (December 9, 1890 – July 13, 1970) was a Canadian author. Her work reflected her Icelandic heritage.  Two of her books won Governor General's awards for literature.

Early life
Salverson was born Laura Goodman in Winnipeg, Manitoba, the daughter of Lárus Guðmundsson and Ingibjörg Guðmundsdóttir who immigrated to Winnipeg in 1887 from Grundir in Bolungarvík, Iceland. She married George Salverson in 1913.

Career
While a young housewife and mother, Salverson began writing poetry. Several of her poems were published by local newspapers.

In 1923 Salverson published her first novel. The Viking Heart. She went on to write several novels based on Icelandic sagas and themes.  Many of the characters in her stories were Scandinavian and German.

Salverson wrote about her experiences with poverty and racial prejudice. Her writings reflected her belief that Icelandic immigrants to Canada should maintain and support their Icelandic culture.  In 1939 she wrote an autobiography.

Works
 The Viking Heart (1923)
 When Sparrows Fall (1925)
 Wayside Gleams (1925)
 Lord of the Silver Dragons (1927)
 The Dove (1933)
 The Dark Weaver: Against the Sombre Background of the Old Generations Flame the Scarlet Banners of the New (1937), winner of a 1937 Governor General's Award
 Black Lace (1938)
 Confessions of an Immigrant's Daughter (1939), winner of a 1939 Governor General's Award
 Immortal Rock: The Saga of the Kensington Stone (1954), winner of the 1954 Ryerson Fiction Award

References

External links
 
 
 Laura Goodman Salverson fonds, LMS-0016 are held at Library and Archives Canada. There are other complementary material in Laura Goodman Salverson fonds (R5600)

1890 births
1970 deaths
20th-century Canadian novelists
20th-century Canadian women writers
Canadian women non-fiction writers
Canadian women novelists
Governor General's Award-winning fiction writers
Governor General's Award-winning non-fiction writers
Writers from Winnipeg